Valerie Gruest (born 14 March 1999) is a Guatemalan swimmer who competed at the 2016 Summer Olympics.

Biography
Gruest was born on 14 March 1999. She took four national swimming records  before she joined Northwestern University in Illinois in 2015. The Sports Writers’ Association of Guatemala voted her "Rookie Athlete" of the year.

Gruest competed in the women's 400 metre freestyle and 800m freestyle events at the 2016 Summer Olympics.

References

External links
 

1999 births
Living people
Guatemalan female swimmers
Olympic swimmers of Guatemala
Swimmers at the 2016 Summer Olympics
Place of birth missing (living people)
Swimmers at the 2014 Summer Youth Olympics
Pan American Games competitors for Guatemala
Swimmers at the 2015 Pan American Games
Guatemalan female freestyle swimmers
21st-century Guatemalan women